Bugles in the Afternoon is a 1952 American Western film directed by William Cagney and starring Ray Milland, Helena Carter, Hugh Marlowe and Forrest Tucker, based on the 1943 novel by Ernest Haycox. The story features the Battle of the Little Big Horn.

Plot
A rivalry between two U.S. cavalry officers results in Capt. Kern Shafter being court martialed for striking a fellow officer, Lt. Edward Garnett, with a saber. Shafter claimed to be defending the honor of his fiancée. The court martial found Shafter guilty as charged and was dismissed from the US Army.

After his dismissal from the Army, Shafter drifted for a while and then decides to enlist in the Army as a private. He chose to enlist at Fort Abraham Lincoln in the Dakota territory. On the trip Fort Lincoln, he meets a woman Josephine Russell when they were both waiting to board a stagecoach to Fargo. When they reached Bismarck in the Dakota territory, Shafter heads to Fort Abraham Lincoln and enlists in the 7th Cavalry. He is assigned to a company commanded by an old friend and former sergeant major, Capt. Myles Moylan, and given the rank of sergeant.

Shafter makes friends with Private Donovan who was formerly a sergeant until he punched a sergeant major. The two of them are assigned to investigate the murder of local miners by Sioux tribesmen, leading to a dangerous encounter. When these risky missions continue, Capt. Moylan begins to realize that Garnett is deliberately putting Kern at risk. Moylan puts into motion an effort to clear Shafter.

The feud escalates when Shafter discovers that Garnett also has romantic designs on Josephine. Unaware of the history between the two men, or of Garnett's true character, she feels that Shafter should be dealing with issues more reasonably. She is angered when Shafter strikes Garnett.

The soldiers leave with Lt. Col. George Armstrong Custer to engage the Sioux. Garnett deliberately puts Shafter, Donovan, and another soldier in danger by sending the three on a scouting mission, claiming there are no Sioux warriors in the vicinity. The three see their company fall back as they discover a large Sioux war party in their scouting area. After his friend Donovan is fatally wounded, Shafter is able to get back to his command, only to witness Custer's entire command killed in battle. Garnett pursues Shafter during a different skirmish with the Sioux, and the two scuffle until Shafter is knocked out by Garnett. When Garnett is about to drop a large rock on Shafter, a Sioux warrior fatally shoots Garnett. Capt. Moylan arrives and kills the warrior, and informs Shafter he saw the end of the fight with Garnett. The two then regroup with their command to fight the Sioux. Shafter is shot during this battle.

Shafter and Moylan survive. Thanks to Moylan, Kern's reputation and rank of captain are restored and Josephine now sees Shafter as the man she wants.

Cast
 Ray Milland as Sgt. Kern Shafter  
 Helena Carter as Josephine Russell  
 Hugh Marlowe as Capt. Edward Garnett  
 Forrest Tucker as Pvt. Donovan  
 Barton MacLane as Cap. Myles Moylan 
 George Reeves as Lt. Smith
 James Millican as Sgt. Hines
 Gertrude Michael as May
 Stuart Randall as Bannack Bill
 William 'Bill' Phillips as Tinney
 Hugh Beaumont as Lt. Cooke (uncredited)
 Walter Coy as	Capt. Benteen (uncredited)
 Charles Evans as Gen. Terry (uncredited)
 Sheb Wooley as Custer (uncredited)

Production

Development
The film was based on a novel by Ernest Haycox which was published in 1944 and was serialised in The Saturday Evening Post. The New York Times called it "competent".

In May 1944 William Cagney purchased the screen rights intending to make it a vehicle for his brother James Cagney. It would be the first of six films William Cagney would make for United Artists. The others would be Blood on the Sun, Only the Valiant, Port Royal, The Stray Lamb and an untitled mystery romance. In August 1944 Ring Lardner Jnr was assigned to write the script, which. was intended to star James Cagney.

The movie was meant to follow Blood on the Sun but was put back when Cagney elected to make The Time of Your Life instead.

By March 1949 the Cagney deal with United Artists had ended and William Cagney signed a three-picture deal with Warner Bros; the films were to be  Only the Valiant, A Lion in the Streets and Bugles in the Afternoon. In September 1950 William Cagney announced Harry Brown was writing the script.

In February 1951 Warners announced that Harry Brown and Geoffrey Home had written the script and that filming would start in May. They hoped for Errol Flynn to play the lead. In April Roy Rowland, who had signed a long-term deal with Cagney Productions, was going to direct; he left for Utah to scout locations and Cagney were still hopeful Flynn would star.

In April William Cagney announced he had signed Ray Milland to star and that Helena Carter, David Brian and Robert Preston would co star. (Carter had previously made Kiss Tomorrow Goodbye with Cagney.|) Ward Bond was also mentioned. Then by May Brian – who had refused to make the film and was put on suspension – was replaced by Hugh Marlowe borrowed from 20th Century Fox and Bond – who had to go make The Quiet Man was replaced by James Millican. By June Forrest Tucker joined the cast, presumably in the role intended for Preston.

Filming
Filming took place in June 1951. Parts of the film were shot in Johnson Canyon, Long Canyon, Asay Creek, Kanab Canyon, Aspen Mirror Lake, and Strawberry Valley in Utah.

In late June, the unit returned from Utah.

References

External links
 
 
 

1952 films
1952 Western (genre) films
American Western (genre) films
Cultural depictions of George Armstrong Custer
Films based on American novels
Films based on Western (genre) novels
Films directed by Roy Rowland
Films scored by Dimitri Tiomkin
Films set in 1876
Films set in Montana
Films set in North Dakota
Films shot in Utah
Films with screenplays by Harry Brown (writer)
Warner Bros. films
Western (genre) cavalry films
1950s American films